Dorothea Frances Bleek (later Dorothy F. Bleek; born 26 March 1873, Mowbray, Cape Town – died 27 June 1948, Newlands, Cape Town) was a South African-born German anthropologist and philologist known for her research on the Bushmen (the San people) of southern Africa.

Life and work 
Dorothea Bleek was the fifth daughter of Wilhelm Bleek, a pioneering philologist studying the languages and cultures of southern Africa in the late 1800s. Much of his work was done in partnership with his sister-in-law (Dorothy Bleek's aunt, Lucy Lloyd). The work of Dorothy Bleek was largely a continuation of her father and aunt's research, but she also made numerous notable contributions of her own to the field. Her culminating work, published after death, was the book A Bushman Dictionary, still referenced today.

Laurens van der Post, who liked to think of himself as "a white Bushman", credited her book Mantis and His Hunter (along with Specimens of Bushman Folklore by her father and aunt) as "a sort of Stone Age Bible". This is in the introduction to The Heart of the Hunter (1961), a follow-up to The Lost World of the Kalahari, the book based on the BBC series that brought the Bushmen to international attention.

Bleek's research and findings are often overshadowed by the work of her father, and she has been criticised for lacking the empathy and intuition of him and her aunt. This has led to a misperception of her as a racist.

Despite this, Bleek's research on the language, customs, and especially rock art of southern Africa (present-day South Africa, Tanzania, Botswana, and Namibia) stands as a vital contribution to scholarship on the region. Her photographs and audio recordings were especially important to later researchers.

Bibliography
 The Mantis and his friends, 1923
 The Naron, a Bushman tribe of the central Kalahari, 1928
 Comparative vocabularies of Bushman languages, 1929

Notes

External links
The San (Bushman) Photographs of Dorothea Bleek, University of Cape Town Libraries 
The Digital Bleek and Lloyd

1873 births
1948 deaths
German anthropologists
German philologists
German women scientists
South African anthropologists
South African women scientists
Linguists from South Africa
South African emigrants to Germany
German women anthropologists
South African women anthropologists
Women linguists
20th-century philologists
People from Cape Town
Linguists of Khoisan languages